The Southerners were a political faction of the Joseon Dynasty. The faction was created after the split of the Easterners in 1591 by Yi Sanhae's opponents. Its leader was Ryu Seong-ryong, who died in 1607. Leader Heo Mok was Left Prime Minister from 1675 to 1678. Leader Yun Hyu was executed in 1680. They supported Jang Huibin, queen consort of Sukjong of Joseon from 1688 to 1694. The faction continued to exist until the 18th century.

Members
Ryu Seong-ryong
Yun Seon-do 
Yun Hyu 
Heo Mok 
Heo Jeok 
Jang Huibin 
Jeong Yak-yong 

Joseon dynasty
Political history of Korea